The Demise of the Crown Act 1901 is an Act of Parliament of the Parliament of the United Kingdom.

It provides that the holding of any office under the Crown shall not be affected, nor shall any fresh appointment thereto be rendered necessary, by the demise of the Crown.

Section 1 (2) provided that the Act took effect retrospectively "as from the last demise of the Crown"; i.e. the death of Queen Victoria. Section 1 (2) was repealed as spent legislation by the Statute Law (Repeals) Act 1973.

In the Republic of Ireland, the Act was repealed in its entirety by the Statute Law Revision Act 2007.

See also
 Demise of the Crown
 Demise of the Crown Act 1702
 Demise of the Crown Act 1727

References

Notes

Other sources
The Law & Working of the Constitution: Documents 1660-1914, ed. W. C. Costin & J. Steven Watson. A&C Black, 1952. Vol. II (1784-1914), p. 136

External links

United Kingdom Acts of Parliament 1901
1901 in law